Big Radio 2 is a Bosnian commercial radio station, broadcasting from Banja Luka.

Big Radio 2 was launched in 1992.

Frequencies
The program is currently broadcast on 26 frequencies:

 Gacko 
 Višegrad 
 Prijedor 
 Sanski Most 
 Glamoč 
 Banja Luka 
 Novi Grad, Republika Srpska 
 Sarajevo 
 Kalinovik 
 Bugojno 
 Tuzla 
 Mostar 
 Majevica 
 Foča 
 Modriča 
 Doboj 
 Derventa 
 Prnjavor, Bosnia and Herzegovina 
 Teslić 
 Mrkonjić Grad 
 Velika Kladuša 
 Stolac 
 Drvar 
 Trebinje 
 Zenica 
 Travnik

See also 
List of radio stations in Bosnia and Herzegovina

References

External links 
 
 Communications Regulatory Agency of Bosnia and Herzegovina

Banja Luka
Radio stations established in 1992
Mass media in Banja Luka